Aindileas Ua Chlúmháin (died 1170) was an Irish poet.

Aindileas was the son of Gilla Aenghus Ua Chlúmháin, ollamh of Connacht in poetry, who died in 1143.

No surviving poems by either are known to still exist, except perhaps anonymously. A later bearer of the name, who died in 1438, is listed as O'Clumain, Chief Poet to O'Hara, a Chief of the Name in County Sligo.

See also

 Ó Chlúmháin

External links

References

 The Surnames of Ireland, Edward MacLysaght, 1978.
 The Life, Legends and Legacy of Saint Kerrill, Joseph Mannion, p. 93, 2004. 

People from County Galway
Medieval Irish poets
12th-century Irish writers
1170 deaths
Year of birth unknown
12th-century Irish poets
Irish male poets